Chah Dimeh (also Romanized as Chāh Dīmeh and Chāhdīmeh) is a village in Horgan Rural District, in the Central District of Neyriz County, Fars Province, Iran. At the 2006 census, its population was 65, in 19 families.

References 

Populated places in Neyriz County